The men's sprint at the 2016 Olympic Games in Rio de Janeiro took place on 12–14 August 2016. There were 27 competitors from 16 nations, as once again nations were allowed to enter up to two cyclists (the limit had fluctuated between one and two since 1928). The event was won by Jason Kenny of Great Britain, successfully defending his gold from 2012 and making it the third straight Games that Great Britain was atop the podium for the sprint. Kenny was the third man to win two consecutive gold medals in the sprint, fourth man to win two golds at any point, and third man to win three medals of any color. He beat his teammate Callum Skinner in the final; it was the second time in three Games that Great Britain had both the top spots—and potentially could have been the third if nations had not been limited to a single cyclist in 2012. Denis Dmitriev earned Russia's first men's sprint medal with his bronze.

The medals were presented by Barry Maister, IOC member, New Zealand and David Lappartient, Vice President of the UCI.

Background

This was the 26th appearance of the event, which has been held at every Summer Olympics except 1904 and 1912. Four of the quarterfinalists from 2012 returned: gold medalist (and 2008 silver medalist) Jason Kenny of Great Britain, silver medalist Grégory Baugé of France, fourth-place finisher Njisane Phillip of Trinidad and Tobago, and fifth-place finisher Denis Dmitriev of Russia. Baugé had won the 2015 world championship (adding to his 2009–12 run, though the 2011 title had been stripped from him) and Dmitriev had been a fixture on the world championships podium throughout the four years since the last Games. Kenny had struggled for much of that period, but had a strong 2016 including a victory over Matthew Glaetzer of Australia in the 2016 worlds final.

No nations made their debut in the men's sprint. France made its 26th appearance, the only nation to have competed at every appearance of the event.

Qualification

There were 27 quota places available for the sprint. The nine nations qualified for the team sprint event could enter two members of the team in the individual sprint. The other nine places were assigned to nations based on the 2014–16 UCI track rankings, with one place for each of the top nine nations not qualified through team sprint.

Competition format

The event was a single-elimination tournament, with repechages after the first two rounds, after seeding via time trial. The time trial involved an 875 metre distance, but with only the last 200 metres timed. All other races were 750 metres (three laps of the track) with side-by-side starts, with time kept for the last 200 metres. The first two main rounds featured single head-to-head races, with winners advancing and losers competing in repechages. Repechage races were contested by up to 3 cyclists. Beginning with the quarterfinals, each match pitted two cyclists against each other in best-of-three races.

Records

The records for the sprint are 200 metre flying time trial records, kept for the qualifying round in later Games as well as for the finish of races.

Callum Skinner set a new Olympic record of 9.703 seconds in the qualifying round, but Jason Kenny regained the record with his time of 9.551. Matthew Glaetzer also finished under the old record time.

Schedule 

All times are Brasília Time (UTC-03:00)

Results

Qualifying round

 Was also an Olympic record until superseded by Jason Kenny

Round 1

Heat 1

Heat 2

Heat 3

Heat 4

Heat 5

Heat 6

Heat 7

Heat 8

Heat 9

First repechage

First repechage heat 1

First repechage heat 2

First repechage heat 3

1/8 finals

1/8 final 1

1/8 final 2

1/8 final 3

1/8 final 4

1/8 final 5

1/8 final 6

Second repechage

Second repechage heat 1

Second repechage heat 2

Quarterfinals

Quarterfinal 1

Quarterfinal 2

Quarterfinal 3

Quarterfinal 4

Semifinals

Semifinal 1

Semifinal 2

Finals

Classification 9—12

Classification 5—8

Bronze medal match

Gold medal match

Final classification

References

sprint
Cycling at the Summer Olympics – Men's sprint
Men's events at the 2016 Summer Olympics